"Un ami ça n'a pas de prix" is a song by French singer Johnny Hallyday. It was released on an EP titled "Johnny lui dit adieu / Un ami ça n'a pas de prix" in 1965.

Composition and writing 
The song was written by Ralph Bernet and Larry Gréco.

Commercial performance 
The song was released on an EP titled "Johnny lui dit adieu / Un ami ça n'a pas de prix" in 1965.

In France the EP charted as "Un ami ça n'a pas de prix" and spent one week at no. 1 on the singles sales chart (in January 1965).

In Wallonia (French Belgium) it charted as a double A-side "Johnny lui dit adieu / Un ami ça n'a pas de prix" and reached no. 6.

Track listing 
7" (45 RPM) EP Philips 437.007 BE (1974, France)
 A1. "Johnny lui dit adieu" ("Tell Her Johnny Said Goodbye") (2:42)
 A2. "On te montrera du doigt" ("You Finally Said Something Good") (2:27)
 B1. "Un ami ça n'a pas de prix" (2:26)
 B2. "	Maudite rivière" (2:31)

Charts

"Un ami ça n'a pas de prix"

"Johnny lui dit adieu"

References

External links 
 Johnny Hallyday – Un ami ça n'a pas de prix / Johnny lui dit adieu (EP) at Discogs

Songs about friendship
1965 songs
1965 singles
1965 EPs
French songs
Johnny Hallyday songs
Philips Records singles
Number-one singles in France